Sir William Henry Marling, 2nd Baronet, JP, DL (1 July 1835 – 19 October 1919)  was an English baronet.

Early life
Marling was born in Stroud to Sir Samuel Marling. He was educated at Trinity College, Cambridge.

Marriage
Marling married Mary Abraham in 1860: they had four sons.

Succession
Marling succeeded his father in 1883; and was succeeded by his son in 1919.

County office
Marling was appointed High Sheriff of Gloucestershire in 1888.

References

1835 births
1919 deaths
People from Stroud District
Baronets in the Baronetage of the United Kingdom
Deputy Lieutenants of Gloucestershire
High Sheriffs of Gloucestershire
Alumni of Trinity College, Cambridge
English justices of the peace